Guapimirim Environmental Protection Area is a coastal marine protected area on Guanabara Bay in the state of Rio de Janeiro, southeastern Brazil.

Location

It is administered by the Chico Mendes Institute for Biodiversity Conservation.
The area includes all or part of the municipalities of Guapimirim, Itaboraí, Magé and São Gonçalo in the state of Rio de Janeiro.
It contains the strictly protected  Guanabara Ecological Station, created in 2006.
It is in the Central Rio de Janeiro Atlantic Forest Mosaic, created in 2006.

Mangrove ecology
The area includes the  Guanabara Ecological Station, created on 15 February 2006, which protects one of the last sections of midsize contiguous mangrove habitats in the state. The mangroves shelter species that are endangered in the state, including the anhinga (Anhinga anhinga), fulvous whistling duck (Dendrocygna bicolor), and broad-snouted caiman (Caiman latirostris).

Conservation
The area is classed as IUCN protected area category V, protected landscape/seascape.   The purpose is to maintain biological diversity, manage human settlements and ensure sustainable use of natural resources.
The main goal is to protect the remaining mangroves in Guanabara Bay, and to preserve the human populations that maintain a traditional lifestyle in a close relationship with the environment.
Protected species include the starfish Coscinasterias tenuispina.

See also

References

Sources

Environmental protection areas of Brazil
Guanabara Bay
Mangroves
Protected areas of Rio de Janeiro (state)